Dibunate is a cough suppressant. As the sodium salt, it has been marketed under the name Becantyl (in the United Kingdom), Becantex (in continental Europe), or Linctussal with a dosage of 20 to 30 mg, as either syrup or tablets.

Similar to benzonatate, it is a peripherally acting drug. It has not been reported to cause sedation, euphoria, habituation, or respiratory depression, unlike narcotic antitussives such as codeine. It may work by blocking afferent signals in the reflex arc which controls cough. Nausea is rarely seen as an adverse effect.

References 

Antitussives
Sulfonic acids